Compans-Caffarelli is a business district in Toulouse in Haute-Garonne, France, where companies and grandes écoles are located.

It is located close to the Canal du Midi.

Name 
The name is from the French Divisional General Jean Dominique Compans and the French général de division of Italian descent Marie-François Auguste de Caffarelli du Falga.

Geography 
The district is between the Canal de Brienne (south) and the Canal du Midi (north).

Buildings and Monuments 
Compans-Caffarelli welcomes hotels, companies (such as EDF, Orange Business Services), sports and commercial areas, as well as the Toulouse 1 University Capitole, Toulouse Business School, a campus of Epitech (IT college), a campus of IPSA (aerospace college), a campus of ISEG (communication school) etc.

References 

Education in Toulouse
Toulouse
Neighbourhoods in France